Pseudoparamys cezannei is a species of extinct rodent in family Ischyromyidae.  It is named after  French post-impressionist painter Paul Cézanne.

See also
List of organisms named after famous people (born 1800–1899)

References

Prehistoric rodents
Mammals described in 1987